Srinda (born 20 August 1985) is an Indian actress, model, and dubbing artist who predominantly works in the Malayalam cinema. Her debut film was Four Friends (2010). She is best known for her roles in Malayalam movies 22 Female Kottayam (2012), Annayum Rasoolum (2013), 1983 (2014), Freedom Fight (2022), Kuruthi (2021), Bheeshma Parvam (2022), and Aadu (2017).

Career
Srinda attended St. Mary's Anglo Indian Girls High School, Fort Kochi, until Class 10 before transferring to a school in Palluruthy for Higher Secondary School Certificate studies. She later studied at the Sacred Heart College, Thevara.

Being passionate about films and photography since she was young, Srinda started her film career as an assistant director. She then briefly worked as a television anchor but felt her "heart wasn't in it. I felt like something was missing, which I found in films". Before appearing in a documentary, she modelled for products such as hair oils and jewellery brands. This eventually led her to feature films, where she was noticed by director Dileesh Nair, who introduced her to Aashiq Abu.

Even though her debut film was Four Friends (2010), Aashiq Abu's 22 Female Kottayam (2012) is considered her cinematic debut. She played the lead character's friend.[1] Srinda stated that the film "shaped her as an actor". In the following months, she played supporting roles in several films, such as Thattathin Marayathu (2012), 101 Weddings (2012), North 24 Kaatham (2013), Artist (2013), and Annayum Rasoolum (2013). In 2014, Srinda played a notable lead role in the sports film 1983 (2014). Later that year, she portrayed a police officer in the political satire Masala Republic (2014), and starred in two films that were released on the same day, Tamaar Padaar (2014) and Homely Meals (2014).

Personal life 
Srinda married at 19 and has a son Arhaan. After obtaining a divorce, she married Siju. S. Bava in 2018.

Filmography

As narrator and voice-over

TV series
 Uppum Mulakum

Albums
 Mayamadhavam
 Celebrate Happiness

Dubbing career
 Kammatipaadam (2016) – for Shaun Romy (Anitha)
 Thondimuthalum Driksakshiyum (2017) – for Nimisha Sajayan (Sreeja)
 Saudi Vellakka (2022) – for Dhanya Ananya (Naseema)

As technical crew member
 China Town (2011)
 Hero (2012)
 Casanovva (2012)

Awards
Vanitha Film Awards
2015: Best Supporting Actress – 1983
Asianet Film Awards
2017: Best Supporting Actress – Parava, Njandukalude Nattil Oridavela, Munthirivallikal Thalirkkumbol
Nomination – Filmfare Award for Best Supporting Actress – Malayalam – Sherlock Toms

References

External links

Actresses in Malayalam cinema
Indian film actresses
Actresses from Kochi
Living people
1986 births
Indian women television presenters
Indian television presenters
21st-century Indian actresses
Actresses in Tamil cinema
Actresses in Malayalam television